Ytre Øksningan (Outer Øksningan) is an island in the municipality of Herøy in Nordland county, Norway. Together with Indre Øksningan, it is part of the Øksningan archipelago. It is connected to the rest of Herøy by Norwegian County Road 166. The largest village on the island is Innerøya on the southeast shore of the island.

See also
List of islands of Norway

References

Islands of Nordland
Herøy, Nordland